Frank Stäbler (also spelled Staebler; born 27 June 1989) is a German Greco-Roman wrestler. He won the 2012 European Championship and 2015 World Championship in the welterweight category. Stäbler trains at TSV Musberg in Leinfelden-Echterdingen, Germany, coached by Janis Zamanduridis from the national wrestling team.

Career
Stäbler represented Germany at the 2012 Summer Olympics in London, where he competed in the 66 kg class in men's Greco-Roman wrestling. He received a bye for the second preliminary match, before losing out to Hungary's Tamás Lőrincz, who was able to score six points in two straight periods, leaving Stäbler with a single point. Because his opponent advanced further into the final match, Stäbler offered another shot for the bronze medal by successfully defeating United States' Justin Lester in the repechage bout. However, he lost the bronze medal match to Georgia's Manuchar Tskhadaia, who pushed him out of the wrestling mat in the third period, with a score of 1–3.

International achievements

 all competitions are held in Greco-Roman style of wrestling
 OG – Olympic Games; ECh – European Championships; WCh – World Championships
 Light weight is a class under 66 kg in UWW classification.

German Championships
(only Senior)

Trivia
Stäbler's logo, which appears on the official merchandise, his video diary and printed media, is a jumping squirrel. During the final fight in 2012 European Wrestling Championships Stäbler literally jumped on the opponent and won the title of European champion 2012. Later this jump was called as "squirrel jump" (orig. "Eichhörnchen Sprung") by German journalists.

References

External links

 
 
 
 
 
 Frank Stäbler — Olympic medal hope of Germany, Der Spiegel 
  

1989 births
Living people
People from Böblingen
German male sport wrestlers
Olympic wrestlers of Germany
Wrestlers at the 2012 Summer Olympics
Wrestlers at the 2016 Summer Olympics
European Games bronze medalists for Germany
European Games medalists in wrestling
Wrestlers at the 2015 European Games
World Wrestling Championships medalists
European Wrestling Championships medalists
Wrestlers at the 2020 Summer Olympics
Medalists at the 2020 Summer Olympics
Olympic medalists in wrestling
Olympic bronze medalists for Germany
European Wrestling Champions
Sportspeople from Stuttgart (region)
20th-century German people
21st-century German people